Cassandra "Cassie" Jackman  (born 22 December 1972 and competing in some years as Cassie Campion) is a former English squash player who won the World Open in 1999. She was England's leading player throughout much of the 1990s and early 21st century. She retired due to a recurring back injury in December 2004.

Jackman was appointed Member of the Order of the British Empire (MBE) in the 2004 Birthday Honours for services to squash.

Career

Born in North Walsham, Norfolk, she won five British under-23 titles, and five senior British national titles.

She represented England at four World Team Championships in 1992 in Vancouver, 1994 in Saint Peter Port, Guernsey, 1996 in Malaysia and 2004 in Amsterdam. 

She lost the 1996 World Open final to Sarah Fitz-Gerald 9–4, 9–2, 4–9, 9–6 who would go on to win another four World Opens. At the 1998 Commonwealth Games she won a gold medal in the doubles with Sue Wright, and a bronze in the singles.

In 1999 she won the World Open title.

See also
 List of WISPA number 1 ranked players
 Official Women's Squash World Ranking

References

External links
 

1972 births
Living people
English female squash players
Commonwealth Games gold medallists for England
Commonwealth Games silver medallists for England
Commonwealth Games bronze medallists for England
Commonwealth Games medallists in squash
Squash players at the 1998 Commonwealth Games
Squash players at the 2002 Commonwealth Games
People from North Walsham
Members of the Order of the British Empire
Medallists at the 1998 Commonwealth Games
Medallists at the 2002 Commonwealth Games